Ponometia septuosa is a species of bird dropping moth in the family Noctuidae. It is found in North America.

The MONA or Hodges number for Ponometia septuosa is 9085.1.

References

Further reading

External links

 

Acontiinae